City of Djinns: A Year in Delhi (1993) is a travelogue by William Dalrymple about the historical capital of India, Delhi. It is his second book, and culminated as a result of his six-year stay in New Delhi.

The City of Djinns is one of the first books by William Dalrymple which doesn't revolve around the history of India, rather it represents various anecdotes of his time in India and explores the history of India with the help of various characters he meets, like the Puri family, the driver, the customs officer, and British survivors of the Raj, 
as well as whirling dervishes and eunuch dancers (‘a strange mix of piety and bawdiness’). Dalrymple describes ancient ruins and the experience of living in the modern city: he goes in search of the history behind the epic stories of the Mahabharata. Still more seriously, he finds evidence of the city’s violent past and present day—the 1857 mutiny against British rule; the Partition massacres in 1947; and the riots after the assassination of Indira Gandhi in 1984.

The book followed his established style of historical digressions, tied in with contemporary events and a multitude of anecdotes.

Adaptations
The book was adapted into a play in 2007 by Rahul Dasinnur Pulkeshi of Delhi-based Dreamtheatre.
Dalrymple was played by Bollywood and stage actor Tom Alter, with Zohra Sehgal playing the role of Nora Nicholson, a British national who prefers to stay in India after it achieves independence.

Awards
Thomas Cook Travel Book Award (1994)
Sunday Times Young Writer of the Year Award (1994)

Citation
Dalrymple, William (1994).  City of Djinns: A Year in Delhi. Flamingo.

References

British travel books
1993 non-fiction books
Culture of Delhi
Books about Delhi
Jinn in popular culture
Books by William Dalrymple